Glancing Madly Backwards is an album by Swedish progressive rock band Qoph. Released in May 2014, the album contains unreleased and hard-to-find tracks recorded between 1994 and 2004. Several Qoph line ups are represented on the album.

Track listing

Personnel
 Robin Kvist – vocals
 Filip Norman – guitar
 Jimmy Wahlsteen – guitar
 Fredrik Rönnqvist – guitar
 Federico de Costa – drums
 Patrik Persson – bass
 Henric Jordan – bass

Guest musicians
 Karl Asp – saxophone, (on "Kalejdoskopiska Aktiviteter", "Ögonblick")
 Jens Busch – saxophone, (on "Förförande Rädsla")
 Mats Öberg – moog , (on "Anticipations")
 Nicke Almqvist – harmonica, (on "Metamorphosis")

References

2014 compilation albums
Qoph (band) albums